Taungup, Toungup or Toungok is a principal town of the Taungup Township in the Rakhine State of westernmost part of Myanmar. As of May 2020, there is one case of COVID-19, one of two cases in not only Thandwe township, but the whole Rakhine State.It got 29.1 inches of rainfall on 21 July 2011.  It was record breaking and there was severe flooding.
The population of Taungup (Toungup) Urban area is 28,652 as of 2014, while Taungup Township's population is 114,437. 
There are 2 Universities in Rakhine State,One located in Sittwe( Sittwe University) and another One located in Taungup(Taungup University).

References

Township capitals of Myanmar
Populated places in Rakhine State